The Latvia national football team represents Latvia in international football and is controlled by the Latvian Football Federation, the governing body for football in Latvia. They have never qualified for the FIFA World Cup, however, they have qualified for the European Championship in 2004 under head coach Aleksandrs Starkovs.

Latvia, alongside their Baltic rivals, Lithuania and Estonia, have also participated in the local sub-regional Baltic Cup tournament, which takes place every two years. Latvia has won the Baltic Cup championship a record 13 times, more than any other country in the history of the tournament, most recently in 2018.

Latvia's current home ground is the Daugava Stadium in Riga.

History

Early years 
Latvia played their first match in 1922, a game against Estonia, which finished in a 1–1 draw. Latvia have won the Baltic Cup 12 times, and played 99 official games during its pre-war period from 1922 to 1940.

In 1937, the Latvian team participated in the first qualification tournament for the 1938 World Cup. Latvia were placed in Group 8, alongside Austria and Lithuania. Latvia beat Lithuania 4–2 in Riga, after a Fricis Kaņeps hat-trick and an Iļja Vestermans goal. In Kaunas, they won 5–1, after two goals each from Kaņeps, Vaclavs Borduško, and Vestermans, but lost 1–2 in the decisive away match against Austria, despite an early goal from Vestermans. In April 1938, the Austrian Anschluss made the Austrian team unable to participate, however, despite being the group's runner-up, Latvia was not invited to the tournament by FIFA to replace Austria .

In 1940, Latvia was occupied and annexed by the Soviet Union; the country regained its independence in 1991 and played their first match against Estonia on 16 November of that year in the Baltic Cup, and their first FIFA-recognized match against Romania on 8 April 1992 in Bucharest, a match, which Latvia lost 2–0.

In September 2003, Latvia surprisingly finished second, ahead of Poland, in their qualifying group for Euro 2004. This meant they qualified for the play-offs, where they were drawn against Turkey. Latvia won the first leg 1–0, through top goalscorer, Māris Verpakovskis. The second leg finished in a 2–2 draw, with Latvia winning 3–2 on aggregate, thus qualifying for the tournament. This resulted in Latvia being the first and only Baltic team, as well as being the second former-Soviet state in Europe at the time (after Russia) to qualify for a European Championship. At Euro 2004, Latvia were drawn in Group D, alongside Germany, Czech Republic, and Netherlands. Latvia faced Czech Republic in their opening match on 15 June 2004, with Verpakovskis scoring before half-time. However, the Czechs would later come back to win the game 2–1. Four days later, Latvia earned a respectable 0–0 draw against Germany to earn their first point in a major tournament. They lost their final match with 3–0 against Netherlands, and were eliminated, finishing fourth, with one point from their draw and two losses.

Latvia have since failed to qualify for another major tournament, although they came close to qualifying for the 2010 FIFA World Cup. After eight qualifying matches, Latvia were level on points with their next opponent, second-placed Greece, but a 5–2 defeat virtually ended all hopes of qualification and Latvia finished third in UEFA Group 2. Recent years have seen a sharp decline with many losses. In the EURO 2020 qualifiers, Latvia lost 9 out of 10 games, including a woeful 0-5 home loss to Slovenia.

Stadium
The majority of home matches take place at the Daugava Stadium in Riga. Between 2000 and 2018, the main base for the team was the Skonto Stadium, which was built as a temporary location due to the planned renovation of Daugava Stadium, which started only in 2017, with the first stage completed a year later.

Home venues record
The following table provides a summary of Latvia's results at home venues since 1992.
.

Results and fixtures

2022

2023

Coaching staff

Coaching history

Technical Commission (1922–1923)
 Juris Rēdlihs-Raiskums (1924)
 Willy Malousek (1924)
 Walter Wilson (1925)
 Ferenc Molnár (1926)
 Karl Kurz (1927)
 Willy Malousek (1929)
 Juris Rēdlihs-Raiskums (1930–1931)
 Jānis Lapiņš (1932–1934)
 Ferenc Voggenhuber (1935)
 Rudolf Stanzel (1936–1939)
 Kārlis Upenieks (1940)
 Jānis Gilis (1992–1997)
 Revaz Dzodzuashvili (1998–1999)
 Gary Johnson (1999–2001)
 Aleksandrs Starkovs (2001–2004)
 Jurijs Andrejevs (2004–2007)
 Aleksandrs Starkovs (2007–2013)
 Marians Pahars (2013–2017)
 Aleksandrs Starkovs (2017–2018)
 Mixu Paatelainen (2018) 
 Slaviša Stojanovič (2019–2020)
 Dainis Kazakevičs (2020–present)

Players

Current squad
The following players have been called up for the Friendly match on 22 March 2023 against Republic of Ireland and the UEFA Euro 2024 qualifying match against Wales on 28 March 2023.

Caps and goals as of 19 November 2022, after the match against Iceland.

Recent call-ups
The following players have been called up within the last twelve months.

 RET

INJ Withdrew due to injury
RET Retired from national team
|}

Player records

Players in bold are still active with Latvia.

Most capped players

Top goalscorers

Hat-tricks

 4 Player scored 4 goals

Clean sheets

Competitive record

FIFA World Cup

UEFA European Championship

UEFA Nations League

Baltic Cup

Olympic Games

Head-to-head record
As of 11 October 2021 after match against 

*Draws include knockout matches decided on penalty kicks.

Kits and crest

Latvia's kit is traditionally a carmine red jersey with white trim, carmine red shorts and socks, whilst their current away kit is all predominantly white. Latvia's kits have been produced by various manufacturers. Rather than displaying the logo of the Latvian Football Federation, Latvia's jersey from the 2018 features the Latvia National Teams brand #11wolves.

Kit suppliers

See also

Latvia men's national under-21 football team
Latvia men's national under-19 football team
Latvia men's national under-17 football team
Latvia women's national football team
Latvia women's national under-17 football team

References

External links

Official website  
Latvia at FIFA
Latvia at UEFA
Latvia at RSSSF

 
European national association football teams
Football in Latvia